Washing meat or cleaning meat is a technique of preparation, primarily used to treat raw meat or poultry prior to cooking in order to sanitize it. Several methods are used which are not limited to rinsing with running water (or with the use of a strainer) or soaking in saltwater, vinegar or lemon juice (or other citric acids), while it may simultaneously enhance flavor when cooked.

Effectiveness
Neither the U.S. Food and Drug Administration nor the United States Department of Agriculture recommend washing or cleaning meats, as cross-contamination can likely spread bacteria from raw meat and poultry juices to other foods, utensils and surfaces. While it might have been appropriate at one time in order to remove impurities due to self-slaughtered meats, according to the USDA, in modern times, no further washing is needed as meat and poultry are cleaned during processing.

Conversely, according to the Food Science and Technology International, organic acids such as acetic (i.e. vinegar), and citric (i.e. lemon, limes), lactic, malic, propionic, and tartaric are among those that are an effective alternative for the prevention of Salmonella outbreaks due to contamination of meat.

Modern usage persists 
Although not recommended by the USDA, washing meat is a longstanding technique used in many household kitchens and by top chefs, many of whom recommend it in their cookbooks and on cooking television networks. Similarly, the same recommendation of avoiding cross-contamination is advised of brining and the usages of marinades.

After the CDC warned against washing chicken before cooking in statement posted on Twitter on 29 April 2019, there was a strong backlash by black communities from all over, many of whom still implement this practice in their culinary uses today.

According to a study conducted by Jennifer Quinlan of Drexel University, roughly 90% of people say they wash their chicken before cooking.

See also

 Brining

References

Cooking techniques
Food preparation techniques
Culinary terminology
Salted foods